Caryocolum vicinella is a moth of the family Gelechiidae. It is found in most of Europe, eastwards to the southern Ural.

Taxonomy
The wingspan is about 12 mm. The forewings are dark brown. There is a light dorsal margin between one- and three-fifths and two white wedge-shaped spots extend from the fold towards the costa at one-fifth. Adults are on wing from July to September.

The larvae feed on Cerastium arvense, Dianthus, Lychnis alpina, Lychnis viscaria, Minuartia, Petrorhagia prolifera, Petrorhagia saxifraga, Silene inflata, Silene nutans, Silene vulgaris maritima, Spergularia rubra, Stellaria media, Stellaria nemorum and Stellaria uliginosum. They may mine the leaves of their host plant when young, but this is unconfirmed. Older larvae mine the stem of their host plant, although other sources state they live among spun shoots. Larvae can be found from mid April to the beginning of June.

Gallery

References

External links

vicinella
Moths described in 1851
Moths of Europe
Taxa named by John William Douglas